Solex may refer to:

 Solex (musician), Dutch musician
 Solex (manufacturer), a French manufacturer of carburetors and the powered bicycle VéloSoleX
 Solex College, a former private for-profit college in Chicago, Illinois
 Solex Unit, a fictional Solar-Generator in the film The Man with the Golden Gun
 VéloSoleX, a French cyclemotor also known as simply Solex
 SOLEX (software), astronomy software used for ephemeris and orbit determination

See also
 Solexa, a British company acquired by Illumina, Inc.